Langerado Music Festival was an annual music festival, taking place in early spring in South Florida, first organized in 2003 by Ethan Schwartz. In 2008, the festival was held at the Seminole Big Cypress Indian Reservation in the Everglades. The festival featured primarily music of the jamband genre, but also offered a wide selection of other musical styles and traditionally offered a stage for local bands, as well.

On June 1, 2011, tickets went on sale for the 2011 festival.

Past Langerado Festivals
2009 Langerado Music Festival
2008 Langerado Music Festival
2007 Langerado Music Festival
2006 Langerado Music Festival
2005 Langerado Music Festival
2004 Langerado Music Festival
2003 Langerado Music Festival

See also

List of jam band music festivals

References

External links
 Langerado Official Website

 
Music festivals in Florida
Rock festivals in the United States
Jam band festivals
Music festivals established in 2003
2003 establishments in Florida